This list of motion picture film formats catalogues formats developed for shooting or viewing motion pictures, ranging from the Chronophotographe format from 1888, to mid-20th century formats such as the 1953 CinemaScope format, to more recent formats such as the 1992 IMAX HD format. 

To be included in this list, the formats must all have been used in the field or for test shooting, and they must all use photochemical images that are formed or projected on a film base, a transparent substrate which supports the photosensitive emulsion.
As well, the formats must have been used to make more than just a few test frames. The camera must be fast enough (in frames per second) to create an illusion of motion consistent with the persistence of vision phenomenon. The format must be significantly unique from other listed formats in regard to its image capture or image projection. The format characteristics should be clearly definable in several listed parameters (e. g., film gauge, aspect ratio, etc.).

Legend 
 Format is the name of the process; some formats may have multiple names in common usage.
 Creator is the individual or company most directly attributable as the developer of the system.
 Year created usually refers to the earliest date that the system was used to completion (i.e. projection), but may refer to when it was developed if no known film was made.
 First known film is the first film (not including tests) made with the format and intended for release.
 Negative gauge is the film gauge (width) used for the original camera negative.
 Negative aspect ratio is the image ratio determined by the ratio of the gate dimensions multiplied by the anamorphic power of the camera lenses (1× in the case of spherical lenses).
 Gate dimensions are the width and height of the camera gate aperture, and by extension the film negative frame.
 Negative pulldown describes the film perforations per frame, the direction of film transport, and standard frame speed. Film transport is assumed to be vertical unless otherwise noted, and standard frame speed is assumed to be 24 frames per second unless the film is otherwise noted or has no standard. Silent film has no standard speed; many amateur formats have several common speeds, but no standard.
 Negative lenses indicates whether spherical (normal) or anamorphic lenses are used on the original camera negative, and if anamorphic lenses, what anamorphic power is used.
 Projection gauge is the film gauge (width) used for the release print.
 Projection aspect ratio is the image ratio determined by the ratio of the projection dimensions multiplied by the anamorphic power of the projection lenses (1× in the case of spherical lenses). This is also known as the intended theatrical aspect ratio.
 Projection dimensions are the width and height of the projector aperture plate, and by extension the film frame area which is projected. The aperture plate always very slightly crops the frame.
 Projection lenses indicates whether spherical (normal) or anamorphic lenses are used on the projector, and if anamorphic lenses, what anamorphic power is used.

Formats are listed in chronological order and by release date in the case of multiple formats within one year, if this can be determined. Undated formats are listed at the bottom in alphabetical order.

Film formats 
 The table does not cover 3-D film systems or color film systems, nor is it well-suited to emphasize the differences between those systems.

See also 

 List of anamorphic format trade names
 Color motion picture film
 List of film sound systems
Display resolution
Display aspect ratio

Notes

References 
 Carr, Robert E. and Hayes, R. M., Wide Screen Movies. A History and Filmography of Wide Gauge Filmmaking. Mc Farland & Company, 1988.
 Hart, Martin. American Widescreen Museum, 1996–2008. Retrieved on 2008-05-16.
 Herbert, Stephen and Luke McKernan, eds. Who's Who of Victorian Cinema, 1996–2006. Retrieved on 2006-12-01.
 Hummel, Rob (editor). American Cinematographer Manual, 8th edition. Hollywood: ASC Press, 2001.
 Naimark, Michael. Expo '92 Seville, Presence, Vol. 1, No. 3. MIT Press, Summer 1992. Retrieved on 2006-12-01.
 Nystrom, J.E. History of sub-35mm Film Formats and Cameras, 1998–2001. Retrieved on 2006-12-01.
 Sherlock, Daniel J. "Wide Screen Movies" Corrections, 1994–2004. Retrieved on 2006-12-01.

Further reading 

 Baumgarten, Martin W. 8 mm Film Gauges, 2006. Retrieved on 2006-12-01.
 de Vries, Tjitte. "Cinematographe Lumiere" a myth? Who invented the cinema?, 2006. Retrieved on 2006-10-22.
 Eastman Kodak Corporation. 40 Years of Super 8, 2005. Retrieved on 2006-12-01.
 Eastman Kodak Corporation. Kodak Chronology of Motion Picture Films. 2003. Retrieved on 2006-12-01.
 eFilmCenter. Ultimate Table of Formats and Aspect Ratios, date unknown. Retrieved on 2006-12-01.
 Fisher, David. Chronomedia, 1970–2006. Retrieved on 2006-10-22.
 Hart, Douglas C. The Camera Assistant: A Complete Professional Handbook. Newton, Massachusetts: Focal Press, 1996.
 Hauerslev, Thomas, ed. in70mm.com, 1985–2006. Retrieved on 2006-12-01.
 Hayes, John. But First, a Brief History of Widescreen... Wide Screen Movies Magazine, Vol. 1, 2002. Retrieved on 2006-12-01.
 Herbert, Stephen. Museum of the Moving Image, date unknown. Retrieved on 2006-12-01.
 Horak, Jan-Christopher. Introduction to Film Gauges. UCLA Film and Television Archive, 2000. Retrieved on 2006-12-01.
 Internet Movie Database Incorporated. Internet Movie Database, 1990–2006. Retrieved on 2006-12-01.
 Jennings, Tom (editor). The Dead Media Project, 2001? Retrieved on 2006-10-22.
 Kattelle, Alan. A Brief History of Amateur Film Gauges and Related Equipment, 1899–2001, 2003. Retrieved on 2006-10-22.
 Library of Congress, History of Edison Motion Pictures, date unknown. Retrieved on 2006-12-01.
 MCC Logical Designs. Technical Info. date unknown. Retrieved on 2006-12-01.
 Mendrala, Jim. Aspect Ratio and Image Cutoff, 1994. Retrieved on 2006-10-22.
 Munafo, Robert P. Film Formats at MROB, 1996–2008. Retrieved on 2006-12-01.
 Musser, Charles. Edison film notes, 2005. Retrieved on 2006-12-01.
 Naughton, Russell. Adventures in Cybersound, 1998–2003. Retrieved on 2006-10-22.
 Newnham, Grahame. Pathefilm collecting, 2000–2006. Retrieved on 2006-12-01.
 Norwood, Scott E. Film Tech FAQ, 1998. Retrieved on 2006-12-01.
 Panavision Incorporated. Panavision: Technical Information: Aspect Ratio Overview, 2004. Retrieved on 2006-12-01.
 Roepke, Martina and Henk Verheul. Ernemann film, 2002–2006. Retrieved on 2006-12-01.
 Science Museum Group. Cinematography collection. Retrieved 2020-05-04.
 ScreenSound Australia. Film Formats, date unknown. Retrieved on 2006-12-01.
 ScreenSound Australia. Film Gauges, date unknown. Retrieved on 2006-12-01.
 Society of Camera Operators. Operating Cameraman Magazine, 1991–2005. Retrieved on 2006-12-01.
 UCLA Film and Television Archive. UCLA Film and Television Archive Terminology, Definitions, and Abbreviations List, 2004. Retrieved on 2006-12-01.
 unknown author. Formats 8 mm, 2004–2005. Retrieved on 2008-06-23.
 Vigeant, Rhonda. Max 8 Press Release, 2005. Retrieved on 2006-12-01.
 Westphal, Kyle. An Enlarged History of Magnascope, 2016. Retrieved on 2018-01-18
 Wittmann, Armin Michael. One Long Image. Dissertation for the Swiss Federal Institute of Technology, Zurich, 1999. Retrieved on 2006-12-01.

Film formats
Film formats